The Loire 46 was a French single-seater fighter aircraft of the 1930s. A high-winged monoplane designed and built by Loire Aviation, it was purchased by the French Air Force. It was also supplied to the Spanish Republican forces during the Spanish Civil War, but was almost out of service by the outbreak of World War II.

Design and development
The Loire 46 was an improved modification of two previous Loire fighters—the Loire 43 and 45. Although improved, it resembled the earlier machines retaining their gull mono-wing configuration, open cockpit, and fixed landing gear. The first of five prototype Loire 46s flew in September 1934. It demonstrated excellent handling characteristics and 60 production aircraft were ordered by the Armée de l'Air.

Operational history
The initial machines arrived at fighter Escadrilles in August 1936. In September 1936, the five prototype Loire 46s were sent to the Republican forces during the Spanish Civil War.

By the beginning of World War II, the Loire 46's gull wing configuration was recognized as obsolete and most of these fighters had been relegated to Armée de l'Air training schools, where they were used as advanced trainers. However, one fighter Escadrille was still equipped with the Loire 46 during the early weeks of the war. Their performance against modern German fighters was predictable.

Variants
Loire 46.01
First Loire 46 prototype.
Loire 46
Single-seat fighter/trainer aircraft.

Operators

Armee de l'Air

Spanish Republican Air Force

Specifications (Loire 46)

See also
Comparable and similar aircraft
PZL P.11/PZL P.24
Dewoitine D.371/D372
Gourdou-Leseurre GL.30
Nieuport-Delage NiD-122
Curtiss F13C

References

Bibliography

External links

 

Loire 046
World War II French fighter aircraft
046
Single-engined tractor aircraft
High-wing aircraft
Aircraft first flown in 1934